The Orange County Blues Festival was an annual multi-day blues event held in Dana Point, California. Similar to the nearby Topanga Canyon Blues Festival, it attracted some of the major blues artists in the United States. Some of the most notable artists to have appeared there are Canned Heat, Johnny Copeland and Etta James. The Orange County Blues Festival has since been replaced by the Doheny Blues Festival, a newer event that takes place at another location in Dana Point.

History
The Orange County Blues Festival was located at Heritage Park, Dana Point. The festival was created following a discussion between Portland Blues Festival organizer John Vincent and resident of Dana Point, Jim Oakes. With the popularity of outside festivals increasing, the two sought to bring one to Orange County. Due to Vincent's ties, the festival was largely modeled after the Portland Blues Festival. In addition to the main stage for the headlining acts, another stage was set up for school bands play. There was also a fine arts fair with between 35 and 50 stall booths. Some of the proceeds of the festival were to go to a youth recovery program.  The promoter for the 1993 event was Eric Jensen.

Issues
In 1994, the organizers of the festival were involved in a legal dispute based on who held the naming rights to the event. Jim Oakes claimed he was the owner of the festival name. Former partners John Christian and John Dew were wanting to organize a rivaling blues festival as well.

The festival was set to go ahead in September 1994 but was halted by a conflicting event. Oakes had applied for a permit for the festival to be held from the 24th to the 25th at Heritage Park, but it was discovered by city officials that a wedding had been booked for the 24th in the same location. City officials informed Oakes that the wedding had first priority. To complicate matters even further, another festival also named the Orange County Blues Festival was set to take place on October 1 at Doheny State Beach. The organizers of the Doheny State Beach festival were the former partners of Oakes.

Past lineups
1993
 Sept 24: Rod Piazza & the Mighty Flyers, Al Blake, Lynwood Slim featuring Kid Ramos.
 Sept 25:  Johnny Copeland, Canned Heat, Al Rapone & the Zydeco Express, Guitar Shorty, Latele Barton and the Taildraggers, King Ernest, Smokey Wilson.
 Sept 26: Earl Thomas, Beau Jocque & the Zydeco High-Rollers, Robert Lucas, Juke Logan, Brenda Burns.
1994 
 Cancelled
1995
 Junior Wells, Rod Piazza & The Mighty Flyers, Wilson Pickett, Jeff Healey Band, Luther Allison

References

External links
 Magazine advertisement with the highlights
 Magazine advertisement with list of artists. Etta James insert
 Weekend Reviews : Pop Music : Strong Performances at New Orange County Blues Festival by Bill Kohlhaase

1993 establishments in California
Music festivals established in 1993
Blues festivals in the United States
Festivals in Orange County, California
Music festivals in California
Tourist attractions in Orange County, California